Ben Lugmore at  is the 29th-highest peak in Ireland on the Arderin scale, and the 37th-highest peak on the Vandeleur-Lynam scale. The massif is between Killary Harbour and Doo Lough, in Mayo.  

The peak is noted for its long summit ridge that forms a deep cliff-lined headwall around the corrie of Lug More; the corrie includes a feature known as The Ramp that climbers use to access the summit ridge, as well as rock climbs and winter ice climbs.  While the peak can be accessed via a 3-hour walk from the corrie below, it is also summited by way of the 6-7 hour Mweelrea Horseshoe, described as a "top three" mountain walk in Ireland.

Naming

Irish academic Paul Tempan lists Ben Lugmore as an anglicisation of the  that translates as "peak of the big hollow", and which describes the deep corrie on Lugmore's northeast face called Lug More (split into two words).  Patrick Weston Joyce chronicled that the term Lugmore, which he translated as "Great Hollow", appears in several other Irish placenames; and there are several entries in the Placenames Database of Ireland.

Geology

Ben Lugmore's geology is what is known as the Mweelrea Formation, and is very different from that of the Twelve Bens, on the other side of Killary Harbour.  At a summary level, the Mweelrea Formation consists of Ordovician period sandstones originally deposited on large alluvial fans, and distally‐equivalent alluvial plains and delta fans.  Interbedded with these sandstones are tufts, being ash deposits from Ordovician period volcanos.

Geography

The peak of Ben Lugmore lies on the northern arm of the horseshoe that forms the massif of the Mweelrea Mountains, which is bounded by Killary Harbour, Ireland's deepest fjord, to the south, and Doo Lough to the north; Mweelrea, the provincial top for Connacht, lies near the apex of this horseshoe.

Ben Lugmore is described as having a small sharp "airy" summit which lies on a high narrow southeast to northwest ridge that links with Ben Bury, and then on to Mweelrea. From a distance, Ben Lugmore's profile is that of a long and high sharp ridge, along which its various summits (main and subsidiary) are dotted.

Northeast of Ben Lugmore's ridge are the cliffs of the deep corrie of Lug More (also called ), which itself looks into the small valley of Glencullin at the junction of Doo Lough and Glencullin Lough.  To the southwest of the ridge is the valley of Glenconnelly; and where the high southwestern cliffs of Ben Lugmore West Top, Benbury and Mweelrea circle the northern corrie lake at the head of the Glenconnelly valley, known as Lough Bellawaum.

Ben Lugmore's own prominence of  qualifies it as a Marilyn, and it also ranks it as the 18th-highest mountain in Ireland on the MountainViews Online Database 100 Highest Irish Mountains, where the minimum prominence threshold is 100 metres.  The peak is listed as the 29th-highest peak in Ireland on the Arderin scale, and the 37th-highest peak on the Vandeleur-Lynam scale.

Recreation

Hill walking

The most direct route to the summit of Ben Lugmore is the  3-hour round trip via the Lug More (or ) corrie and the valley of Glen Glencullin.  A notable feature known as The Ramp is used, which crosses the headwall of this corrie at mid-way, from east to west in an upward slope; reaching the ridge of Ben Lugmore at a col with Ben Bury. While this route is direct, caution is advised in properly finding The Ramp, as the corrie has extensive cliffs.  This route can also be extended into a  6-hour round-trip that takes in the additional summits of Ben Bury and Mweelrea as well.

Ben Lugmore is also climbed as part of the  6-7 hour Mweelrea Horseshoe (being the 2nd-highest peak on the route), which is described in Ireland's Best Walks (2014), as being one of the "top three" mountain walks in Ireland.  The circuit starts and ends at the Delphi Mountain Resort, and takes in all the peaks of the massif of Mweelrea, including Ben Lugmore (and its subsidiary peaks), Ben Bury, Mweelrea and the Mweelrea SE Spur (marked as point 495-metres in the OS map).

Rock climbing
Some of the first ascents date from the mid 1950s, and they often follow chimneys and gullies between Ben Lugmore's various subsidiary peaks. 

More serious modern rock climbing routes are located at the edge of the southern entrance to the corrie (marked as Askaneeraun on the OS Maps), at the Doo Lough Crags (marked Teevaree Rocks on the OS Maps).  The routes vary from 30 to 70 metres on sandstone and conglomerate rock, with rock climbing grades in the range of VS (Very Severe) to E2 (Extreme, level 2), and well regarded climbs of Bragela's Watch (E1), Red Dawn (E2 5c), and Letter to Breshnev (E3/4 6a); most of the best routes were developed in the late 1980s to early 1990s.

Winter climbing

The Lug More (or ) corrie also has a number of winter climbs, the most notable of which is Recession Gully (Grade II/III).

Gallery

See also

List of Hewitt mountains in England, Wales and Ireland
Lists of mountains and hills in the British Isles
Lists of mountains in Ireland
Maumturks, a major range in Connemara

References

Bibliography

External links
MountainViews: The Irish Mountain Website, Ben Lugmore
MountainViews: Irish Online Mountain Database
The Database of British and Irish Hills , the largest database of British Isles mountains ("DoBIH")
Hill Bagging UK & Ireland, the searchable interface for the DoBIH

Marilyns of Ireland
Hewitts of Ireland
Mountains and hills of County Galway
Geography of County Galway
Mountains under 1000 metres